The Saka (Ancient Egyptian:  ,  ; , old , mod.), Shaka (Sanskrit (Brāhmī): ,  , ; Sanskrit (Devanāgarī):), or Sacae were a group of nomadic Iranian peoples who historically inhabited the northern and eastern Eurasian Steppe and the Tarim Basin.

The Sakas were closely related to the European Scythians, and both groups formed part of the wider Scythian cultures and ultimately derived from the earlier Andronovo culture, and the Saka language formed part of the Scythian languages. However, the Sakas of the Asian steppes are to be distinguished from the Scythians of the Pontic Steppe; and although the ancient Persians, ancient Greeks, and ancient Babylonians respectively used the names "Saka," "Scythian," and "Cimmerian" for all the steppe nomads, the name "Saka" is used specifically for the ancient nomads of the eastern steppe, while "Scythian" is used for the related group of nomads living in the western steppe; While the Cimmerians were often described by contemporaries as culturally Scythian, they may have differed ethnically from the Scythians proper, to whom the Cimmerians were related, and who also displaced and replaced the Cimmerians.

Prominent archaeological remains of the Sakas include Arzhan, Tunnug, the Pazyryk burials, the Issyk kurgan, Saka Kurgan tombs, the Barrows of Tasmola and possibly Tillya Tepe.

In the 2nd century BC, many Sakas were driven by the Yuezhi from the steppe into Sogdia and Bactria and then to the northwest of the Indian subcontinent, where they were known as the Indo-Scythians. Other Sakas invaded the Parthian Empire, eventually settling in Sistan, while others may have migrated to the Dian Kingdom in Yunnan, China. In the Tarim Basin and Taklamakan Desert of today's Xinjiang Uyghur Autonomous Region, they settled in Khotan, Yarkand, Kashgar and other places.

Name

Etymology

Derived from an Iranian verbal root , "go, roam" (related to "seek") and thus meaning "nomad" was the term , from which came the names:
 Old Persian:  , used by the ancient Persians to designate all nomads of the Eurasian steppe, including the Pontic Scythians
 Ancient Greek:  
 Latin: 
 Sanskrit:   
 Old Chinese:   

From this were descended the following exonyms:
 Old Persian:  
 Ancient Greek:   (plural  ), used by the Ancient Greeks
The Old Armenian:   is based on itacistic Greek

A late Scythian sound change from /δ/ to /l/ resulted in the evolution of  into . From this was derived the Greek word  , which, according to Herodotus, was the self-designation of the Royal Scythians.

Other sound changes have produced  .

Identification
The name  was used by the ancient Persian to refer to all the Iranian nomadic tribes living to the north of their empire, including both those who lived between the Caspian Sea and the Hungry steppe, and those who lived to the north of the Danube and the Black Sea. The Assyrians meanwhile called these nomads the Ishkuzai or Askuzai (Akkadian:  ,), and the Ancient Greeks called them Skuthai (Ancient Greek:  ,).

However, following Darius I's campaign of 520 to 518 BC against the Asian nomads, they were differentiated into two groups, both living in Central Asia to the east of the Caspian Sea:
 the  – interpreted as " who lay hauma (around the fire)", which can be interpreted as "Saka who revere hauma."

A third name was added after the Darius's campaign north of the Danube:
 the  – "the  who live beyond the (Black) Sea," who were the Pontic Scythians of the East European steppes

An additional term is found in two inscriptions elsewhere:
 the  – "Saka who are beyond Sogdia", a term was used by Darius for the people who formed the north-eastern limits of his empire at the opposite end to satrapy of Kush (the Ethiopians). These  have been suggested to have been the same people as the 

Moreover, Darius the Great's Suez Inscriptions mention two group of Sakas:
 the  – " of the Marshes"
 the  – " of the Land"

Modern terminology 

Although the ancient Persians, ancient Greeks, and ancient Babylonians respectively used the names "Saka," "Scythian," and "Cimmerian" for all the steppe nomads, modern scholars now use the term Saka to refer specifically to Iranian peoples who inhabited the northern and eastern Eurasian Steppe and the Tarim Basin; and while the Cimmerians were often described by contemporaries as culturally Scythian, they may have differed ethnically from the Scythians proper, to whom the Cimmerians were related, and who also displaced and replaced the Cimmerians.

Location

The  and  both lived in the steppe and highland areas located in northern Central Asia and to the east of the Caspian Sea.

The /Massagetae more specifically lived around Chorasmia and in the lowlands of Central Asia located to the east of the Caspian Sea and the south-east of the Aral Sea, in the Kyzylkum Desert and the Ustyurt Plateau, most especially between the Araxes and Iaxartes rivers. The /Massagetae could also be found in the Caspian Steppe. The imprecise description of where the Massagetae lived by ancient authors has however led modern scholars to ascribe to them various locations, such as the Oxus delta, the Iaxartes delta, between the Caspian and Aral seas or forther to the north or north-east, but without basing these suggestions on any conclusive arguments. Other locations assigned to the Massagetae include the area corresponding to modern-day Turkmenistan.

The  lived around the Pamir Mountains and the Ferghana Valley.

Some other Saka groups lived to the east of the Pamir Mountains and to the north of the Iaxartes river, as well as in the regions corresponding to modern-day Qirghizia, Tian Shan, Altai, Tuva, Mongolia, Xinjiang, and Kazakhstan.

The , that is the Saka who were in contact with the Chinese, inhabited the Ili and Chu valleys of modern Kyrgyzstan and Kazakhstan, which was called the "land of the ", i.e. "land of the Saka", in the Book of Han.

History

Origins 

Recent archeological and genetic data suggests that the Western and Eastern Scythians of the 1st millennium BC originated independently, but both combine Yamnaya-related ancestry, which spread eastwards from the area of the European steppes, with an East Asian-related component, which most closely corresponds to the modern North Siberian Nganasan people of the lower Yenisey River, to varying degrees, but generally higher among Eastern Scythians.

On the other hand, archaeological evidence now tends to suggest that the origins of Scythian culture, characterized by its kurgans burial mounds and its Animal style of the 1st millennium BC, are to be found among Eastern Scythians rather than their Western counterparts: eastern kurgans are older than western ones (such as the Altaic kurgan Arzhan 1 in Tuva), and elements of the Animal style are first attested in areas of the Yenisei river and modern-day China in the 10th century CE. The rapid spread of Scythian culture, from the Eastern Scythians to the Western Scythians, is also confirmed by significant east-to-west gene flow across the steppes during the 1st millennium BC.

The Sakas spoke a language belonging to the Iranian branch of the Indo-European languages. The Pazyryk burials of the Pazyryk culture in the Ukok Plateau in the 4th and 3rd centuries BC are thought to be of Saka chieftains. These burials show striking similarities with the earlier Tarim mummies at Gumugou. The Issyk kurgan of south-eastern Kazakhstan, and the Ordos culture of the Ordos Plateau has also been connected with the Saka. It has been suggested that the ruling elite of the Xiongnu was of Saka origin. Some scholars contend that in the 8th century BC, a Saka raid from the Altai may be "connected" with a raid on Zhou China.

Early history 
The Saka are attested in historical and archaeological records dating to around the 8th century BC.

The Saka tribe of the Massagetae/ rose to power in the 8th to 7th centuries BC, when they migrated from the east into Central Asia, from where they expelled the Scythians, another nomadic Iranian tribe to whom they were closely related, after which they came to occupy large areas of the region beginning in the 6th century BC. The Massagetae forcing the Early Scythians to the west across the Araxes river and into the Caucasian and Pontic steppes started a significant movement of the nomadic peoples of the Eurasian Steppe, following which the Scythians displaced the Cimmerians and the Agathyrsi, who were also nomadic Iranian peoples closely related to the Massagetae and the Scythians, conquered their territories, and invaded Western Asia, where their presence had an important role in the history of the ancient civilisations of Mesopotamia, Anatolia, Egypt, and Iran.

During the 7th century BC itself, Saka presence started appearing in the Tarim Basin region.

According to the ancient Greek historian Diodorus Siculus, the Parthians rebelled against the Medes during the reign of Cyaxares, after which the Parthians put their country and capital city under the protection of the Sakas. This was followed by a long war opposing the Medes to the Saka, the latter of whom were led by the queen Zarinaea. At the end of this war, the Parthians accepted Median rule, and the Saka and the Medes made peace.

According to the Greek historian Ctesias, once the Persian Achaemenid Empire's founder, Cyrus, had overthrown his grandfather the Median king Astyages, the Bactrians accepted him as the heir of Astyages and submitted to him, after which he founded the city of Cyropolis on the Iaxartes river as well as seven fortresses to protect the northern frontier of his empire against the Saka. After this, Amorges's queen, Sparethra, defeated Cyrus with a large army of both men and women warriors and captured Parmises, the brother-in-law of Cyrus and the brother of his wife Amytis, as well as Parmises's three sons, whom Sparethra exchanged in return for her husband, after which Cyrus and Amorges became allies, and Amorges helped Cyrus conquer Lydia.

According to Herodotus, Cyrus captured a Massagetaean camp by ruse, after which the Massagetae queen Tomyris led the tribe's main force against the Persians, defeated them, and placed the severed head of Cyrus in a sack full of blood. Some versions of the records of the death of Cyrus named the Derbices, rather than the Massagetae, as the tribe against whom Cyrus died in battle, because the Derbices were a member tribe of the Massagetae confederation or identical with the whole of the Massagetae. After Cyrus had been mortally wounded by the Derbices/Massagetae, Amorges and his  army helped the Persian soldiers defeat them. Cyrus told his sons to respect their own mother as well as Amorges above everyone else before dying.

Possibly shortly before the 520s BC, the Saka expanded into the valleys of the Ili and Chu in eastern Central Asia. Around 30 Saka tombs in the form of kurgans (burial mounds) have also been found in the Tian Shan area dated to between 550–250 BC.

Darius I waged wars against the eastern Sakas during a campaign of 520 to 518 BC where, according to his inscription at Behistun, he conquered the Massagetae/, captured their king Skunxa, and replaced him with a ruler who was loyal to Achaemenid rule. The territories of the Saka were absorbed into the Achaemenid Empire as part of Chorasmia that included much of the territory between the Oxus and the Iaxartes rivers, and the Saka then supplied the Achaemenid army with large number of mounted bowmen. According to Polyaenus, Darius fought against three armies led by three kings, respectively named Sacesphares, Amorges or Homarges, and Thamyris, with Polyaenus's account being based on accurate Persian historical records.

During the period of Achaemenid rule, Central Asia was in contact with Saka populations who were themselves in contact with China.

After Alexander the Great conquered the Achaemenid Empire, the Saka resisted his incursions into Central Asia.

At least by the late 2nd century BC, the Sakas had founded states in the Tarim Basin.

Migrations 

The Saka were pushed out of the Ili and Chu River valleys by the Yuezhi. An account of the movement of these people is given in Sima Qian's Records of the Grand Historian. The Yuehzhi, who originally lived between Tängri Tagh (Tian Shan) and Dunhuang of Gansu, China, were assaulted and forced to flee from the Hexi Corridor of Gansu by the forces of the Xiongnu ruler Modu Chanyu, who conquered the area in 177–176 BC. In turn the Yuehzhi were responsible for attacking and pushing the Sai (i.e. Saka) west into Sogdiana, where, between 140 and 130 BC, the latter crossed the Syr Darya into Bactria. The Saka also moved southwards toward the Pamirs and northern India, where they settled in Kashmir, and eastward, to settle in some of the oasis-states of Tarim Basin sites, like Yanqi (焉耆, Karasahr) and Qiuci (龜茲, Kucha).  The Yuehzhi, themselves under attacks from another nomadic tribe, the Wusun, in 133–132 BC, moved, again, from the Ili and Chu valleys, and occupied the country of Daxia, (大夏, "Bactria").

The ancient Greco-Roman geographer Strabo noted that the four tribes that took down the Bactrians in the Greek and Roman account – the Asioi, Pasianoi, Tokharoi and Sakaraulai – came from land north of the Syr Darya where the Ili and Chu valleys are located. Identification of these four tribes varies, but Sakaraulai may indicate an ancient Saka tribe, the Tokharoi is possibly the Yuezhi, and while the Asioi had been proposed to be groups such as the Wusun or Alans.

René Grousset wrote of the migration of the Saka: "the Saka, under pressure from the Yueh-chih [Yuezhi], overran Sogdiana and then Bactria, there taking the place of the Greeks."  Then, "Thrust back in the south by the Yueh-chih," the Saka occupied "the Saka country, Sakastana, whence the modern Persian Seistan." Some of the Saka fleeing the Yuezhi attacked the Parthian Empire, where they defeated and killed the kings Phraates II and Artabanus. These Sakas were eventually settled by Mithridates II in what become known as Sakastan. According to Harold Walter Bailey, the territory of Drangiana (now in Afghanistan and Pakistan) became known as "Land of the Sakas", and was called Sakastāna in the Persian language of contemporary Iran, in Armenian as Sakastan, with similar equivalents in Pahlavi, Greek, Sogdian, Syriac, Arabic, and the Middle Persian tongue used in Turfan, Xinjiang, China. This is attested in a contemporary Kharosthi inscription found on the Mathura lion capital belonging to the Saka kingdom of the Indo-Scythians (200 BC – 400 AD) in North India, roughly the same time the Chinese record that the Saka had invaded and settled the country of Jibin 罽賓 (i.e. Kashmir, of modern-day India and Pakistan).

Iaroslav Lebedynsky and Victor H. Mair speculate that some Sakas may also have migrated to the area of Yunnan in southern China following their expulsion by the Yuezhi. Excavations of the prehistoric art of the Dian Kingdom of Yunnan have revealed hunting scenes of Caucasoid horsemen in Central Asian clothing. The scenes depicted on these drums sometimes represent these horsemen practising hunting. Animal scenes of felines attacking oxen are also at times reminiscent of Scythian art both in theme and in composition.

Migrations of the 2nd and 1st century BC have left traces in Sogdia and Bactria, but they cannot firmly be attributed to the Saka, similarly with the sites of Sirkap and Taxila in ancient India. The rich graves at Tillya Tepe in Afghanistan are seen as part of a population affected by the Saka.

The Shakya clan of India, to which Gautama Buddha, called Śākyamuni "Sage of the Shakyas", belonged, were also likely Sakas, as Michael Witzel and Christopher I. Beckwith have alleged. The scholar Bryan Levman however criticised this hypothesis for resting on slim to no evidence, and maintains that the Shakyas were a population native to the north-east Gangetic plain who were unrelated to the Iranic Sakas.

Indo-Scythians 

The region in modern Afghanistan and Iran where the Saka moved to became known as "land of the Saka" or Sakastan. This is attested in a contemporary Kharosthi inscription found on the Mathura lion capital belonging to the Saka kingdom of the Indo-Scythians (200 BC – 400 AD) in northern India, roughly the same time the Chinese record that the Saka had invaded and settled the country of Jibin 罽賓 (i.e. Kashmir, of modern-day India and Pakistan). In the Persian language of contemporary Iran the territory of Drangiana was called Sakastāna, in Armenian as Sakastan, with similar equivalents in Pahlavi, Greek, Sogdian, Syriac, Arabic, and the Middle Persian tongue used in Turfan, Xinjiang, China. The Sakas also captured Gandhara and Taxila, and migrated to North India. The most famous Indo-Scythian king was Maues. An Indo-Scythians kingdom was established in Mathura (200 BC – 400 AD). Weer Rajendra Rishi, an Indian linguist, identified linguistic affinities between Indian and Central Asian languages, which further lends credence to the possibility of historical Sakan influence in North India. According to historian Michael Mitchiner, the Abhira tribe were a Saka people cited in the Gunda inscription of the Western Satrap Rudrasimha I dated to AD 181.

Kingdoms in the Tarim Basin

Kingdom of Khotan 

The Kingdom of Khotan was a Saka city state in on the southern edge of the Tarim Basin. As a consequence of the Han–Xiongnu War spanning from 133 BC to 89 AD, the Tarim Basin (now Xinjiang, Northwest China), including Khotan and Kashgar, fell under Han Chinese influence, beginning with the reign of Emperor Wu of Han (r. 141–87 BC).

Archaeological evidence and documents from Khotan and other sites in the Tarim Basin provided information on the language spoken by the Saka.>
The official language of Khotan was initially Gandhari Prakrit written in Kharosthi, and coins from Khotan dated to the 1st century bear dual inscriptions in Chinese and Gandhari Prakrit, indicating links of Khotan to both India and China.  Surviving documents however suggest that an Iranian language was used by the people of the kingdom for a long time Third-century AD documents in Prakrit from nearby Shanshan record the title for the king of Khotan as hinajha (i.e. "generalissimo"), a distinctively Iranian-based word equivalent to the Sanskrit title senapati, yet nearly identical to the Khotanese Saka hīnāysa attested in later Khotanese documents. This, along with the fact that the king's recorded regnal periods were given as the Khotanese kṣuṇa, "implies an established connection between the Iranian inhabitants and the royal power," according to the Professor of Iranian Studies Ronald E. Emmerick. He contended that Khotanese-Saka-language royal rescripts of Khotan dated to the 10th century "makes it likely that the ruler of Khotan was a speaker of Iranian." Furthermore, he argued that the early form of the name of Khotan, hvatana, is connected semantically with the name Saka.

The region once again came under Chinese suzerainty with the campaigns of conquest by Emperor Taizong of Tang (r. 626–649). From the late eighth to ninth centuries, the region changed hands between the rival Tang and Tibetan Empires. However, by the early 11th century the region fell to the Muslim Turkic peoples of the Kara-Khanid Khanate, which led to both the Turkification of the region as well as its conversion from Buddhism to Islam.

Later Khotanese-Saka-language documents, ranging from medical texts to Buddhist literature, have been found in Khotan and Tumshuq (northeast of Kashgar). Similar documents in the Khotanese-Saka language dating mostly to the 10th century have been found in the Dunhuang manuscripts.

Although the ancient Chinese had called Khotan Yutian (于闐), another more native Iranian name occasionally used was Jusadanna (瞿薩旦那), derived from Indo-Iranian Gostan and Gostana, the names of the town and region around it, respectively.

Shule Kingdom 

Much like the neighboring people of the Kingdom of Khotan, people of Kashgar, the capital of Shule, spoke Saka, one of the Eastern Iranian languages.  According to the Book of Han, the Saka split and formed several states in the region.  These Saka states may include two states to the northwest of Kashgar, and Tumshuq to its northeast, and Tushkurgan south in the Pamirs. Kashgar also conquered other states such as Yarkand and Kucha during the Han dynasty, but in its later history, Kashgar was controlled by various empires, including Tang China, before it became part of the Turkic Kara-Khanid Khanate in the 10th century. In the 11th century, according to Mahmud al-Kashgari, some non-Turkic languages like the Kanchaki and Sogdian were still used in some areas in the vicinity of Kashgar, and Kanchaki is thought to belong to the Saka language group. It is believed that the Tarim Basin was linguistically Turkified before the 11th century ended.

Historiography 

Persians referred to all northern nomads as Sakas. Herodotus (IV.64) describes them as Scythians, although they figure under a different name:

Strabo 
In the 1st century BC, the Greek-Roman geographer Strabo gave an extensive description of the peoples of the eastern steppe, whom he located in Central Asia beyond Bactria and Sogdiana.

Strabo went on to list the names of the various tribes he believed to be "Scythian", and in so doing almost certainly conflated them with unrelated tribes of eastern Central Asia. These tribes included the Saka.

(Strabo, Geography, 11.8.1; transl. 1903 by H. C. Hamilton & W. Falconer.)

Indian sources 

The Sakas receive numerous mentions in Indian texts, including the Purāṇas, the Manusmṛiti, the Rāmāyaṇa, the Mahābhārata, and the Mahābhāṣya of Patanjali.

Language 

Modern scholarly consensus is that the Eastern Iranian language ancestral to the Pamir languages in Central Asia and the medieval Saka language of Xinjiang, was one of the Scythian languages. Evidence of the Middle Iranian "Scytho-Khotanese" language survives in Northwest China, where Khotanese-Saka-language documents, ranging from medical texts to Buddhist texts, have been found primarily in Khotan and Tumshuq (northeast of Kashgar). They largely predate the Islamization of Xinjiang under the Turkic-speaking Kara-Khanid Khanate. Similar documents, the Dunhuang manuscripts, were discovered written in the Khotanese Saka language and date mostly from the tenth century.

Attestations of the Saka language show that it was an Eastern Iranian language. The linguistic heartland of Saka was the Kingdom of Khotan, which had two varieties, corresponding to the major settlements at Khotan (now called Hotan) and Tumshuq (now titled Tumxuk). Tumshuqese and Khotanese varieties of Saka contain many borrowings from the Middle Indo-Aryan languages, but also share features with the modern Eastern Iranian languages Wakhi and Pashto.

The Issyk inscription, a short fragment on a silver cup found in the Issyk kurgan in Kazakhstan is believed to be an early example of Saka, constituting one of very few autochthonous epigraphic traces of that language. The inscription is in a variant of Kharosthi. Harmatta identifies the dialect as Khotanese Saka, tentatively translating its as: "The vessel should hold wine of grapes, added cooked food, so much, to the mortal, then added cooked fresh butter on".

A growing body of both linguistic and physical anthropological evidence suggest the Wakhi are descendants of Saka. According to the Indo-Europeanist Martin Kümmel, Wakhi may be classified as a Western Saka dialect; the other attested Saka dialects, Khotanese and Tumshuqese, would then be classified as Eastern Saka.

The Saka heartland was gradually conquered during the Turkic expansion, beginning in the sixth century, and the area was gradually Turkified linguistically under the Uyghurs.

Genetics 

The earliest studies could only analyze segments of mtDNA, thus providing only broad correlations of affinity to modern West Eurasian or East Eurasian populations. For example, in a 2002 study the mitochondrial DNA of Saka period male and female skeletal remains from a double inhumation kurgan at the Beral site in Kazakhstan was analysed. The two individuals were found to be not closely related. The HV1 mitochondrial sequence of the male was similar to the Anderson sequence which is most frequent in European populations. The HV1 sequence of the female suggested a greater likelihood of Asian origins.

More recent studies have been able to type for specific mtDNA lineages. For example, a 2004 study examined the HV1 sequence obtained from a male "Scytho-Siberian" at the Kizil site in the Altai Republic. It belonged to the N1a maternal lineage, a geographically West Eurasian lineage. Another study by the same team, again of mtDNA from two Scytho-Siberian skeletons found in the Altai Republic, showed that they had been typical males "of mixed Euro-Mongoloid origin". One of the individuals was found to carry the F2a maternal lineage, and the other the D lineage, both of which are characteristic of East Eurasian populations.

These early studies have been elaborated by an increasing number of studies by Russian and western scholars. Conclusions are (i) an early, Bronze Age mixing of both west and east Eurasian lineages, with western lineages being found far to the east, but not vice versa; (ii) an apparent reversal by Iron Age times, with an increasing presence of East Eurasian [[[mtDNA]] lineages in the Western steppe; (iii) the possible role of migrations from the south, the Balkano-Danubian and Iranian regions, toward the steppe.

Ancient Y-DNA data was finally provided by Keyser et al in 2009. They studied the haplotypes and haplogroups of 26 ancient human specimens from the Krasnoyarsk area in Siberia dated from between the middle of the 2nd millennium BC and the 4th century AD (Scythian and Sarmatian timeframe). Nearly all subjects belonged to haplogroup R-M17. The authors suggest that their data shows that between the Bronze and the Iron Ages the constellation of populations known variously as Scythians, Andronovians, etc. were blue- (or green-) eyed, fair-skinned and light-haired people who might have played a role in the early development of the Tarim Basin civilisation. Moreover, this study found that they were genetically more closely related to modern populations in eastern Europe than those of central and southern Asia. The ubiquity and dominance of the R1a Y-DNA lineage contrasted markedly with the diversity seen in the mtDNA profiles.

A genetic study published in Nature in May 2018 examined the remains of twenty-eight Sakas buried between ca. 900 BC to AD 1, compromising eight Sakas of southern Siberia (Tagar culture), eight Sakas of the central steppe (Tasmola culture), and twelve Sakas of the Tian Shan. The six samples of Y-DNA extracted from the Tian Shan Saka belonged to the haplogroups R (four samples), R1 and R1a1. The samples of mtDNA extracted from the Tien Shan Saka belonged to C4, H4d, T2a1, U5a1d2b, H2a, U5a1a1, HV6 (two samples), D4j8 (two samples), W1c and G2a1. The study detected significant genetic differences between the Sakas and Scythians of the Pannonian Basin, and between Sakas of southern Siberia, the central steppe and the Tian Shan. Tian Shan Sakas were found to be of about 70% Western Steppe Herder (WSH) ancestry, 25% Siberian Hunter-Gatherer ancestry and 5% Iranian Neolithic ancestry. The Iranian Neolithic ancestry was probably from the Bactria–Margiana Archaeological Complex. Sakas of the Tasmola culture were found to be of about 56% WSH ancestry and 44% West-Siberian Hunter-Gather ancestry. The peoples of the Tagar culture had about 83.5% WSH ancestry, 9% Ancient North Eurasian (ANE) ancestry and 7.5% West-Siberian Hunter-Gatherer ancestry. The study suggested that the Saka were the source of west Eurasian ancestry among the Xiongnu, and that the Huns probably emerged through minor male-driven East Asian geneflow into the Saka through westward migrations by the Xiongnu.

Physical appearance 
Early physical analyses have unanimously concluded that the Saka, even those far to the east (e.g. the Pazyryk region), possessed predominantly "Europid" features, although mixed "Euro-Mongoloid" phenotypes also occur, depending on site and period.

The 2nd century BC Han Chinese envoy Zhang Qian described the Sai (Saka) as having yellow (probably meaning hazel or green), and blue eyes. In Natural History, the 1st century AD Roman author Pliny the Elder characterises the Seres, sometimes identified as Saka or Tocharians, as red-haired and blue-eyed.

Archaeology 

The spectacular grave-goods from Arzhan, and others in Tuva, have been dated from about 900 BC onward, and are associated with the Saka. Burials at Pazyryk in the Altay Mountains have included some spectacularly preserved Sakas of the "Pazyryk culture" – including the Ice Maiden of the 5th century BC.

Pazyryk culture 

Saka burials documented by modern archaeologists include the kurgans at Pazyryk in the Ulagan (Red) district of the Altai Republic, south of Novosibirsk in the Altai Mountains of southern Siberia (near Mongolia). Archaeologists have extrapolated the Pazyryk culture from these finds: five large burial mounds and several smaller ones between 1925 and 1949, one opened in 1947 by Russian archaeologist Sergei Rudenko. The burial mounds concealed chambers of larch-logs covered over with large cairns of boulders and stones.

The Pazyryk culture flourished between the 7th and 3rd century BC in the area associated with the Sacae.

Ordinary Pazyryk graves contain only common utensils, but in one, among other treasures, archaeologists found the famous Pazyryk Carpet, the oldest surviving wool-pile oriental rug. Another striking find, a 3-metre-high four-wheel funerary chariot, survived well-preserved from the 5th to 4th century BC.

Tillia Tepe treasure 

A site found in 1968 in Tillia Tepe (literally "the golden hill") in northern Afghanistan (former Bactria) near Shebergan consisted of the graves of five women and one man with extremely rich jewelry, dated to around the 1st century BC, and probably related to that of Saka tribes normally living slightly to the north. Altogether the graves yielded several thousands of pieces of fine jewelry, usually made from combinations of gold, turquoise and lapis-lazuli.

A high degree of cultural syncretism pervades the findings, however. Hellenistic cultural and artistic influences appear in many of the forms and human depictions (from amorini to rings with the depiction of Athena and her name inscribed in Greek), attributable to the existence of the Seleucid empire and Greco-Bactrian kingdom in the same area until around 140 BC, and the continued existence of the Indo-Greek kingdom in the northwestern Indian sub-continent until the beginning of our era. This testifies to the richness of cultural influences in the area of Bactria at that time.

Eleke Sazy Burial Complex 
In 2020, archaeologists excavated multiple burial mounds in the Eleke Sazy Valley in East Kazakhstan. Here, a large number of gold artifacts were found. These artifacts included golf harness fittings, pendants, chains, appliqués, and more - most of which are in the Animal Style of the Scythian-Saka era dating back to the 5th-4th centuries BC.

Culture

Art 

The art of the Saka was of a similar styles as other Iranian peoples of the steppes, which is referred to collectively as Scythian art. In 2001, the discovery of an undisturbed royal Scythian burial-barrow illustrated Scythian animal-style gold that lacks the direct influence of Greek styles. Forty-four pounds of gold weighed down the royal couple in this burial, discovered near Kyzyl, capital of the Siberian republic of Tuva.

Ancient influences from Central Asia became identifiable in China following contacts of metropolitan China with nomadic western and northwestern border territories from the 8th century BC. The Chinese adopted the Scythian-style animal art of the steppes (descriptions of animals locked in combat), particularly the rectangular belt-plaques made of gold or bronze, and created their own versions in jade and steatite.

Following their expulsion by the Yuezhi, some Saka may also have migrated to the area of Yunnan in southern China. Saka warriors could also have served as mercenaries for the various kingdoms of ancient China. Excavations of the prehistoric art of the Dian civilisation of Yunnan have revealed hunting scenes of Caucasoid horsemen in Central Asian clothing.

Saka influences have been identified as far as Korea and Japan. Various Korean artifacts, such as the royal crowns of the kingdom of Silla, are said to be of "Scythian" design. Similar crowns, brought through contacts with the continent, can also be found in Kofun era Japan.

Clothing 
Similar to other eastern Iranian peoples represented on the reliefs of the Apadāna at Persepolis, Sakas are depicted as wearing long trousers, which cover the uppers of their boots. Over their shoulders they trail a type of long mantle, with one diagonal edge in back. One particular tribe of Sakas (the Saka tigraxaudā) wore pointed caps. Herodotus in his description of the Persian army mentions the Sakas as wearing trousers and tall pointed caps.

Herodotus says Sakas had "high caps tapering to a point and stiffly upright." Asian Saka headgear is clearly visible on the Persepolis Apadana staircase bas-relief – high pointed hat with flaps over ears and the nape of the neck. From China to the Danube delta, men seemed to have worn a variety of soft headgear – either conical like the one described by Herodotus, or rounder, more like a Phrygian cap.

Saka women dressed in much the same fashion as men. A Pazyryk burial, discovered in the 1990s, contained the skeletons of a man and a woman, each with weapons, arrowheads, and an axe. Herodotus mentioned that Sakas had "high caps and … wore trousers." Clothing was sewn from plain-weave wool, hemp cloth, silk fabrics, felt, leather and hides.

Pazyryk findings give the most almost fully preserved garments and clothing worn by the Scythian/Saka peoples. Ancient Persian bas-reliefs, inscriptions from Apadana and Behistun and archaeological findings give visual representations of these garments.

Based on the Pazyryk findings (can be seen also in the south Siberian, Uralic and Kazakhstan rock drawings) some caps were topped with zoomorphic wooden sculptures firmly attached to a cap and forming an integral part of the headgear, similar to the surviving nomad helmets from northern China. Men and warrior women wore tunics, often embroidered, adorned with felt applique work, or metal (golden) plaques.

Persepolis Apadana again serves a good starting point to observe the tunics of the Sakas. They appear to be a sewn, long-sleeved garment that extended to the knees and was girded with a belt, while the owner's weapons were fastened to the belt (sword or dagger, gorytos, battle-axe, whetstone etc.). Based on numerous archeological findings, men and warrior women wore long-sleeved tunics that were always belted, often with richly ornamented belts. The Kazakhstan Saka (e.g. Issyk Golden Man/Maiden) wore shorter and closer-fitting tunics than the Pontic steppe Scythians. Some Pazyryk culture Saka wore short belted tunic with a lapel on the right side, with upright collar, 'puffed' sleeves narrowing at the wrist and bound in narrow cuffs of a color different from the rest of the tunic.

Men and women wore coats: e.g. Pazyryk Saka had many varieties, from fur to felt. They could have worn a riding coat that later was known as a Median robe or Kantus. Long sleeved, and open, it seems that on the Persepolis Apadana Skudrian delegation is perhaps shown wearing such coat. The Pazyryk felt tapestry shows a rider wearing a billowing cloak.

See also 
 Besshatyr Burial Ground
 History of the central steppe
 Sakas in the Mahabharata
 Sakzai
 Shaka era
 
 Maga Brahmin
 Scytho-Siberian world

References

Citations

Bibliography 

 Akiner (28 October 2013). Cultural Change & Continuity in Central Asia. Routledge. .
 Bailey, H. W. 1958. "Languages of the Saka." Handbuch der Orientalistik, I. Abt., 4. Bd., I. Absch., Leiden-Köln. 1958.
 Bailey, H. W. (1979). Dictionary of Khotan Saka. Cambridge University Press. 1979. 1st Paperback edition 2010. 
 
 
 
 Beckwith, Christopher. (1987). The Tibetan Empire in Central Asia. Princeton, NJ: Princeton University Press. .
 
 Bernard, P. (1994). "The Greek Kingdoms of Central Asia". In Harmatta, János. History of civilizations of Central Asia, Volume II. The development of sedentary and nomadic civilizations: 700 B.C. to A.D. 250. Paris: UNESCO. pp. 96–126. .
 Chang, Chun-shu. (2007). The Rise of the Chinese Empire: Volume II; Frontier, Immigration, & Empire in Han China, 130 B.C. – A.D. 157. Ann Arbor: University of Michigan Press, .

 
 
 
 Davis-Kimball, Jeannine. 2002. Warrior Women: An Archaeologist's Search for History's Hidden Heroines. Warner Books, New York. 1st Trade printing, 2003.  (pbk).
 
 
 
 
 
 Bulletin of the Asia Institute: The Archaeology and Art of Central Asia. Studies From the Former Soviet Union. New Series. Edited by B. A. Litvinskii and Carol Altman Bromberg. Translation directed by Mary Fleming Zirin. Vol. 8, (1994), pp. 37–46.
 Emmerick, R. E. (2003) "Iranian Settlement East of the Pamirs", in Ehsan Yarshater (ed), The Cambridge History of Iran, Vol III: The Seleucid, Parthian, and Sasanian Periods, Part 1 (reprint edition) Cambridge: Cambridge University Press, pp 265–266.
 
 Fraser, Antonia. (1989) The Warrior Queens Knopf.
 
 
 
 Hill, John E. (2009) Through the Jade Gate to Rome: A Study of the Silk Routes during the Later Han Dynasty, 1st to 2nd Centuries CE. John E. Hill. BookSurge, Charleston, South Carolina. .
 Hill, John E. 2004. The Peoples of the West from the Weilue 魏略 by Yu Huan 魚豢: A Third Century Chinese Account Composed between 239 and 265 CE. Draft annotated English translation.
 
 
 
 
 
 Loewe, Michael. (1986). "The Former Han Dynasty," in The Cambridge History of China: Volume I: the Ch'in and Han Empires, 221 B.C. – A.D. 220, 103–222. Edited by Denis Twitchett and Michael Loewe. Cambridge: Cambridge University Press. .
 
 Millward, James A. (2007). Eurasian Crossroads: A History of Xinjiang (illustrated ed.). Columbia University Press. .
 
 
 Pulleyblank, Edwin G. 1970. "The Wu-sun and Sakas and the Yüeh-chih Migration." Bulletin of the School of Oriental and African Studies 33 (1970), pp. 154–160.
 Puri, B. N. 1994. "The Sakas and Indo-Parthians." In: History of civilizations of Central Asia, Volume II. The development of sedentary and nomadic civilizations: 700 B.C. to A.D. 250. Harmatta, János, ed., 1994. Paris: UNESCO Publishing, pp. 191–207.
 
 Sulimirski, Tadeusz (1970). The Sarmatians. Volume 73 of Ancient peoples and places. New York: Praeger. pp. 113–114. "The evidence of both the ancient authors and the archaeological remains point to a massive migration of Sacian (Sakas)/Massagetan tribes from the Syr Daria Delta (Central Asia) by the middle of the second century B.C. Some of the Syr Darian tribes; they also invaded North India."
 

 Theobald, Ulrich. (26 November 2011). "Chinese History – Sai 塞 The Saka People or Soghdians." ChinaKnowledge.de. Accessed 2 September 2016.
 Thomas, F. W. 1906. "Sakastana." Journal of the Royal Asiatic Society (1906), pp. 181–216.
 Torday, Laszlo. (1997). Mounted Archers: The Beginnings of Central Asian History. Durham: The Durham Academic Press, .
 
 Tremblay, Xavier (2007), "The Spread of Buddhism in Serindia: Buddhism Among Iranians, Tocharians and Turks before the 13th Century", in The Spread of Buddhism, eds Ann Heirman and Stephan Peter Bumbacker, Leiden: Koninklijke Brill.
 
 
 Wechsler, Howard J.; Twitchett, Dennis C. (1979). Denis C. Twitchett; John K. Fairbank, eds. The Cambridge History of China, Volume 3: Sui and T'ang China, 589–906, Part I. Cambridge University Press. pp. 225–227. .
 
 Xue, Zongzheng (薛宗正). (1992). History of the Turks (突厥史). Beijing: Zhongguo shehui kexue chubanshe. ; OCLC 28622013.
 
 Yu, Taishan. 1998. A Study of Saka History. Sino-Platonic Papers No. 80. July, 1998. Dept. of Asian and Middle Eastern Studies, University of Pennsylvania.
 Yu, Taishan. 2000. A Hypothesis about the Source of the Sai Tribes. Sino-Platonic Papers No. 106. September, 2000. Dept. of Asian and Middle Eastern Studies, University of Pennsylvania.
 
 Yü, Ying-shih. (1986). "Han Foreign Relations," in The Cambridge History of China: Volume I: the Ch'in and Han Empires, 221 B.C. – A.D. 220, 377–462. Edited by Denis Twitchett and Michael Loewe. Cambridge: Cambridge University Press. .

External links 
 
 Scythians / Sacae by Jona Lendering
 Article by Kivisild et al. on genetic heritage of early Indian settlers
 Indian, Japanese and Chinese Emperors – The Sakas/Parthians, 97 BC-125 AD

 
Nomadic groups in Eurasia
Historical Iranian peoples
Iranian nomads
Foreign relations of ancient India
History of Central Asia